Energumen was an science fiction fanzine edited by Mike Glicksohn and Susan Wood Glicksohn from 1970–1973 (fifteen issues), with a special final "11th Anniversary Issue!!" [sic] in 1981 after Susan's death. The fanzine was based in Ottawa. It won the Hugo Award for Best Fanzine in 1973, after having been a nominee for the Hugo Award for both the prior years.

Contributors included (inter alia) Alicia Austin, [John Baglow], John Bangsund, George Barr, Bill Bowers, Terry Carr, Phil Foglio, Jack Gaughan, Joe Haldeman, Joan Hanke-Woods, Jay Kinney, Dave Langford, Tim Kirk, Patrick Nielsen Hayden, Bill Rotsler, Bob Shaw, Stu Shiffman, Dan Steffan, Ted White and Gene Wolfe.

Energumen ceased publication in 1973 with #15, and the Glicksohns' marriage broke up; but planning for a special issue was already well under way at the time of Susan Wood's sudden death in November 1980. Issue 16 ("Just when you Thought it was Safe to Bind your Fanzines") was published by Glicksohn in September 1981.

References

External links
All issues of Energumen at efanzines.com

1970 establishments in Ontario
1981 disestablishments in Ontario
Defunct magazines published in Canada
Hugo Award-winning works
Magazines established in 1970
Magazines disestablished in 1981
Magazines published in Ottawa
Science fiction fanzines
Science fiction magazines published in Canada